The Troitskaya Tower (literally Trinity Tower) is a tower with a through-passage in the center of the northwestern wall of the Moscow Kremlin, which overlooks the Alexander Garden.

The Troitskaya Tower was built in 1495–1499 by an Italian architect Aloisio da Milano (known in Russia as Aleviz Fryazin Milanets). The tower has borne several names, including Rizopolozhenskaya, Znamenskaya, and Karetnaya. It received its current name in 1658 from the Troitskaya Coaching Inn (Троицкое подворье) in the Kremlin. The two-story basement of the tower housed a prison in the 16th–17th centuries. There is the Troitsky Bridge, which is protected by the Kutafia Tower and leads to the gates of the Troitskaya Tower. There was also a clock on top of the tower between 1585 and 1812. In 1707, due to a threat of Swedish invasion, the gun slots of the Troitskaya Tower were enlarged to fit heavy cannons. In 1935, the Soviets installed a red star on top of the Troitskaya Tower. Prior to Soviet rule the tower had an icon of the Holy Trinity atop its outward face.  Because this tower was the formal entrance for huge Communist Party Congresses the icon was totally removed rather than just plastered over as were those on the Spasskaya and Nikolskaya Towers.

The Troitskaya Tower is the tallest tower of the Moscow Kremlin. Today, the gate of the tower is the main visitors' entrance into the Kremlin.

References

Buildings and structures completed in 1499
Towers completed in the 15th century
Moscow Kremlin
Towers in Russia
Moscow Kremlin towers
Cultural heritage monuments of federal significance in Moscow